The Pennsylvania Railroad's steam locomotive class D3 (formerly Class C, pre-1895) comprised sixty-seven 4-4-0 locomotives intended for general passenger and freight service, constructed at the railroad's own Altoona Works (now owned by Norfolk Southern) during 1869–1881.
They were the third standardized class of locomotives on the railroad and the most numerous of the early standard types; they shared many parts with other standard classes.

This design differed from the Class A (later D1) mainly in its smaller drivers for greater tractive effort for freight haulage.  Like all the early standardized 4-4-0s on the PRR, the Class C had a wagon-top boiler with steam dome and a firebox between the two driving axles.

References

4-4-0 locomotives
D03
Railway locomotives introduced in 1869
Scrapped locomotives
Standard gauge locomotives of the United States
Steam locomotives of the United States